Entrance is an unincorporated community in central Alberta in Yellowhead County, located on Highway 40,  northeast of Jasper.

The community was named for the fact the site is a gateway to Jasper National Park.

Climate

References

Localities in Yellowhead County